Seren  is a Welsh female and male name meaning "star". It has become a common female name and was the third most common name for baby girls born in Wales in 2009; in 2010 Seren was the 5th most common name in Wales, and the 288th most common name for newborn girls in England.

Seren is also a popular Turkish name, where it is a surname (including with a cedilla under the 'S'), and a feminine given name.

Given name

Turkish
Seren Serengil (b. 1971), Turkish actress and singer
Seren Şirince (b. 1991), Turkish actress

Welsh
Seren Bundy-Davies (b. 1994), British athlete
Seren Gibson (b. 1988), British model
Seren Waters (b. 1990), British-Kenyan cricketer

Seren Jenkins (b.1992), British chef

Surname

Turkish
Turgay Şeren (1932-2016), Turkish footballer

See also
Ceren, a cognate name in both Turkish and Welsh

References

Feminine given names
Welsh feminine given names
Turkish feminine given names